Amplified Heart is the eighth studio album by British musical duo Everything but the Girl. It was released on 13 June 1994 by Blanco y Negro Records in the U.K. and on 19 July 1994 by Atlantic Records in the United States and Canada. The album was recorded and mixed in London from winter 1993 to 1994.

Primarily an acoustic-driven set, Amplified Heart brought Everything but the Girl to mainstream audiences via the dance remix of the song "Missing". Ultimately peaking at number 2 on the US Billboard Hot 100 singles chart in early 1996, "Missing" spent more than a year gaining airplay and exposing Everything but the Girl to US and worldwide audiences, leading Amplified Heart to sell upwards of 232,000 copies in the United States, according to Nielsen SoundScan. It went on to sell over 1,000,000 copies worldwide.

Amplified Heart was reissued in 2012 by Edsel Records as a two-disc deluxe set.

A 25th anniversary pressing of the album on vinyl was released in 2019. The Todd Terry club mix of "Missing" is not on the vinyl and it was added on to later pressings of the CD as a bonus track.

Track listing

2012 Edsel Records reissue

Personnel
Credits for Amplified Heart adapted from liner notes.

Everything but the Girl
 Tracey Thorn – vocals, production
 Ben Watt – acoustic and electric guitars, acoustic and electric piano, mini Moog, vocals, mixing, production

Additional musicians
 John Coxon – keyboards and production on "Troubled Mind", "Get Me" and "Missing"
 Martin Ditcham – percussion, strings on "I Don't Understand Anything" and "Two Star"
 Peter King – alto saxophone on "Disenchanted"
 Dave Mattacks – drums
 Harry Robinson – string arrangements, conductor
 Kate St John – Cor Anglais on "Two Star"
 Danny Thompson – double bass
 Richard Thompson – lead electric guitar on "25 December"

Production
 Mads Bjerke – engineering
 Jerry Boys – engineering, mixing
 Bruce Davies – mixing
 Jon Mallison – engineering

Design
 Corinne Day – inner sleeve photography
 Everything but the Girl – design
 Richard Haughton – cover and inner sleeve photography
 The Senate – design
 Ponyboy Wildwood – inner sleeve photography

Charts

Weekly charts

Year-end charts

Certifications

References

1994 albums
Everything but the Girl albums
Atlantic Records albums
Blanco y Negro Records albums